The Wild Wild West Gambling Hall & Hotel was a hotel and casino located in Paradise, Nevada. It is owned and operated by Station Casinos.

The Wild Wild West Plaza is located in the parking area and provides services common to a convenience store.

History
Built in 1974, the property originally operated as the King 8 Hotel and Casino. The King 8 was owned by Will Roberts and Olind Jenni, who also owned a King 8 hotel in Fairbanks, Alaska. In February 1988, the King 8 was purchased by the Los Angeles-based Hotel Investors Trust, which planned improvements of the hotel-casino at a cost between $15 million and $17 million.

In 1996, J.A. Tiberti Construction Company purchased the King 8 from Starwood Lodging Trust. In May 1998, after several months of discussions, Station Casinos announced a partnership agreement to lease the property from Tiberti and take over operations. At the time, the King 8 included 283 hotel rooms, a coffee shop, and 230 slot and video poker machines. The King 8 had approximately 250 employees, who had to reapply for their jobs under Station Casinos. The King 8 closed on July 1, 1998, to allow for remodeling. A new sportsbook and restaurant were among the improvements made at the King 8, which reopened as the Wild Wild West Gambling Hall & Hotel on July 13, 1998.

In 2005, Station Casinos started purchasing land next to the property it already owned. While no specific plans have been announced, it is widely expected that this move means that a major redevelopment is planned at this location.

With a working title of Viva, the three casino, hotel condo arena project would wind up costing $10 billion.

Stations Casinos reached an agreement with Days Inn on December 9, 2009, to market the casino hotel under the Days Inn brand. The hotel is marketed as Days Inn by Wyndham – Las Vegas at Wild Wild West Gambling Hall. As part of the negotiations, the rooms were remodeled to bring them up to Days Inn standards.

On September 2, 2022, Station announced that it would close and demolish Wild Wild West to prepare the 20-acre site for future development, in connection with adjoining acreage. It closed on September 7, 2022.

References

External links
 Wild Wild West casino website

1974 establishments in Nevada
Defunct casinos in the Las Vegas Valley
Casinos completed in 1974
Casinos in Paradise, Nevada
Hotel buildings completed in 1974
Companies that filed for Chapter 11 bankruptcy in 2009
Hotels in Paradise, Nevada
Station Casinos
Casino hotels